Askham is a civil parish in the Eden District, Cumbria, England. It contains 57 buildings that are recorded in the National Heritage List for England. Of these, one is listed at Grade I, the highest of the three grades, one is at Grade II*, the middle grade, and the others are at Grade II, the lowest grade.  Apart from the villages of Askham and Helton, the parish is entirely rural.  The most important building in the parish is the country house, Askham Hall; this and associated buildings are listed.   Most of the other listed buildings are houses and associated structures, farmhouses and farm buildings; these are mainly situated in the villages.  The other listed buildings include a church, monuments in the churchyard, public houses, a chapel, a bridge, three lime kilns, and a telephone kiosk.


Key

Buildings

Notes and references

Notes

Citations

Sources

Lists of listed buildings in Cumbria